Kevin William Symons (born February 2, 1971) is an American actor, who is best known for role as Dr. Kevin Adams in the television series Darcy's Wild Life, as well as Councilman Bill Dexhart in the television comedy Parks and Recreation. His other television credits  include Joan of Arcadia, iCarly, Medium, Models, Inc., Sabrina, the Teenage Witch, Veronica Mars, The West Wing, Teen Wolf (2011 TV Series), and as recurring roles in the soap operas, Passions, The Bold and the Beautiful, and ABC Network's Desperate Housewives and on Disney Channel Original Series Best Friends Whenever.

Filmography 
Darcy's Wild Life
Joan of Arcadia
iCarly
Medium
Models Inc.
Sabrina, the Teenage Witch
My Name Is Earl
Veronica Mars
The West Wing
Teen Wolf (2011 TV Series)
Parks and Recreation
Passions
The Bold and the Beautiful
Desperate Housewives
Best Friends Whenever
Henry Danger
This is Us

External links

1971 births
Living people
20th-century American male actors
21st-century American male actors
American male film actors
American male television actors
Place of birth missing (living people)